The Vipers are an Ambazonian separatist militia. Described as a local self-defense group, they cooperate with the larger Ambazonia Defence Forces and SOCADEF. The group was founded early in the Anglophone Crisis, and by December 2017 they commanded between ten and 30 fighters.

The Vipers have claimed responsibility for burning down government buildings. In May 2018, they were blamed for the burning down of an examination center in Bamenda.

References 

 

Military of Ambazonia
National liberation movements in Africa
Secessionist organizations